Rachel "Bunny" Meyer (born August 3, 1985) is an American beauty YouTuber known by the username grav3yardgirl.

YouTube channel 
Based in Pearland, Texas, Meyer started her YouTube channel in December 2010 and mainly made videos about paranormal experiences and trips to graveyards. She later transitioned her channel to focus on fashion and makeup, as well as a series called Does This Thing Really Work? in which she reviews As Seen On TV products. Meyer refers to her followers as her "Swamp Family".

, she has over 8.3 million subscribers and 1.5 billion video views.

Collaborations 
In May 2018, Shane Dawson reached out to Bunny when she was struggling with maintaining an audience and helped re-brand her channel during his documentary-style web series.

Makeup collection 
On June 6, 2016, Meyer released her makeup collection Swamp Queen globally in collaboration with Tarte Cosmetics. The collection was sold at several leading cosmetics stores, such as Macy's, Ulta and Sephora, and included an eyeshadow palette and two lipsticks.

Awards and nominations 
In 2014, Meyer was nominated at the Teen Choice Awards for Choice Web Star: Fashion/Beauty, but lost to Zoe Sugg. She received a second nomination in 2016, but lost to Bethany Mota.

References

External links 

1985 births
American Lutherans
American bloggers
American women bloggers
Beauty and makeup YouTubers
Fashion YouTubers
Lifestyle YouTubers
Living people
People from Houston
Women video bloggers
YouTube vloggers
YouTubers from Texas
21st-century American women